The 1995 Washington State Cougars football team was an American football team that represented Washington State University in the Pacific-10 Conference (Pac-10) during the 1995 NCAA Division I-A football season. In their seventh season under head coach Mike Price, the Cougars compiled a 3–8 record (2–6 in Pac-10, tied for eighth), and were outscored 274 to 236.

The team's statistical leaders included Chad Davis with 1,868 passing yards, Frank Madu with 870 rushing yards, and Eric Moore with 486 receiving yards.

Schedule

Roster

NFL Draft
One Cougar was selected in the 1996 NFL Draft.

References

Washington State
Washington State Cougars football seasons
Washington State Cougars football